John Lockett (8 September 1854 – 13 September 1929) was a New Zealand cricketer. He played in four first-class matches for Wellington from 1874 to 1880.

See also
 List of Wellington representative cricketers

References

External links
 

1854 births
1929 deaths
New Zealand cricketers
Wellington cricketers
West Coast cricketers